Saint Sava Church (also spelled "Savva") was a church of the Russian Mission in Douglas, Alaska.
Its construction was due mainly to Fr. Sebastian Dabovich who, in 1902, had been appointed Dean of the Sitka Deanery and the superintendent of Alaskan missions. Although under the Russian Orthodox Church, and a "daughter" parish of St. Nicholas Church in Juneau, Sebastian Dabovich  found it important that the Serbians that had come to the area — mostly to work in mining— had a church that was "home" to them. On 23 July 1903, Fr. Sebastian, along with Hieromonk Anthony (Deshkevich-Koribut) and the priest Aleksandar Yaroshevich, consecrated the Church of Saint Sava in Douglas. However, the sparse records that remain of this church indicate that by the 1920s it may have been sitting empty, and in 1937 a fire swept through Douglas, destroying most of the town, including Saint Sava Church.  It was not rebuilt.

History
Among those who had made it to Douglas were a group of Serbians, enough to warrant organizing a church. This makes Saint Sava unusual in that it was an Alaskan church not set up as a mission to minister to Native Alaskan peoples, but rather to a group who were already Orthodox Christians. This is an early example of the attempt of Bishop Tikhon to set up churches that represented other Orthodox nationalities in the diaspora, in particular the Syro-Arab mission (led by Bishop Raphael Hawaweeny), and the Serbian Mission, which Archimandrite Sebastian Dabovich would later be named to lead. The land was donated by the Treadwell Gold Mine Company, and though this church was part of the "Russian Mission", a donation for the church's construction was sent from the Council of Bishops in Serbia. The parish members themselves provided funding for various repairs over the years, including a new Church foundation in 1915 and two cemeteries. The building was a fairly simple wooden structure and had a single altar. According to some sources, Fr. Sebastian also participated in the actual construction of the building.

Following a devastating fire in the town, Douglas' population also dropped, and the 1920 census recording only 919 people still living there. By some time in the 1920s, the church was not regularly used. In 1937, fire again burned many buildings Douglas, and the St. Sava Church burned to the ground. It was not subsequently rebuilt.

See also
 Sebastian Dabovich
 Mardarije Uskokovich
 Nikolaj Velimirović
 John Kochurov
 Theophilus Pashkovsky
 Boris Pash
 Alexis Toth

References
Attribution:

External links
The Life of St. Sebastian Dabovich, page 3 (Serbia site)
Library of Congress, Russian Orthodox Greek Catholic Church of America, Diocese of Alaska Records, 1733-1938
Historic Cemeteries in Douglas from the City & Borough of Juneau (PDF)
Find-a-grave Russian Orthodox Cemetery Douglas
Find-a-grave Serbian "Servian" Orthodox Cemetery Douglas
The Church Across the Channel  St. Nicholas Juneau site
 Report from 1916 (PDF) by Fr. Andrew Kashevaroff, then assigned to St. Nicholas in Juneau, recording the local situation.  
 St. Sava Church (Douglas, Alaska) at Orthodox Wiki
Photo of the exterior of St. Sava Church, Douglas Alaska Digital Archives
Photo of interior of St. Sava Church, Douglas Alaska Digital Archives
St. Sava Church standing intact amidst rubble after 1911 fire in Douglas Alaska Digital Archives
Interview with Fr. Sebastian Dabovich, 1903 from the Seattle Post-Intelligencer Orthodox History site

Churches completed in 1903
Buildings and structures demolished in 1937
Buildings and structures in Juneau, Alaska
1937 fires in the United States
Former churches in Alaska
Russian Orthodox church buildings in Alaska
Serbian Orthodox church buildings in the United States